Bastienne Schmidt (born 1961) is a German  artist who works in painting, large-scale drawing and photography. 

Her work is included in the collections of the Museum of Fine Arts Houston, the Brooklyn Museum, the Museum of Modern Art, New York, the Victoria and Albert Museum, the Center for Creative Photography, Tucson, Arizona,

Since 1989, Bastienne Schmidt has worked as a freelance photojournalist for German and American newspapers and magazines.

References

Living people
1961 births
20th-century German photographers
21st-century German photographers
20th-century German women artists
21st-century German women artists